Architect (formerly known as Found Dead Hanging and briefly as Ghost of the Saltwater Machine) is an American political mathcore band from Syracuse, New York, and Philadelphia, Pennsylvania, United States. The band featured vocalist Keith Allen, who was responsible for establishing and booking the yearly festival Hellfest.

Current lineup 
 Thomas Calandra – bass guitar
 James Bailey – guitar
 Mark Mcgee – drums
 Keith Allen – vocals

Former members 
 Ant Michel – drums
 Joe Mangipano – bass guitar
 Shaun Purcell – drums
 Timothy Seib – guitar

Discography 
 Albums
 2007: All Is Not Lost
 2008: Ghost of the Salt Water Machines

 As Found Dead Hanging
 2003: Dulling Occams Razor

References

External links 
 Architect at Black Market Activities

Heavy metal musical groups from New York (state)
American progressive metal musical groups
Musical groups established in 2004
Black Market Activities artists
Metalcore musical groups from New York (state)